Weatherly (US 17) is a 12-metre racing yacht that was an unsuccessful defense candidate for the 1958 America's Cup and victorious defender in the 1962 America's Cup.

Design
Weatherly is a keel sloop designed to the 12-metre Rule.  She was designed by Philip Rhodes and built by Luders Marine Construction Company at Stamford, Connecticut in 1958 for a syndicate of owners formed by New York Yacht Club members Henry D. Mercer, Cornelius S. Walsh and Arnold D. Frese.  Her construction consists of  African mahogany double planking on white oak frames.  Framing is on 10" centers, with two minor steam bent frames between each laminated major frame.  Ring frames, hanging knees, mast step, floor timbers, and all fasteners are of bronze.

Career
Weatherly was skippered from 1958 through 1961 by Arthur Knapp, competing with Columbia, Easterner, and Vim for the right to defend the America's Cup, but was eliminated in the 1958 selection trials by Columbia, which went on to successfully defend that year.

She was modified by Bill Luders at Luders Marine for the 1962 cup, receiving a shortened stern, squared-off rudder and numerous small changes in order to reduce weight, which in turn was put into her keel to allow her to carry sail.

The defender selection trials pitted Weatherly against Columbia, Easterner and the newly designed and built Nefertiti. On 25 August 1962, the NYYC selected Weatherly to defend the Cup against Australian challenger Gretel.  Skippered by Emil "Bus" Mosbacher, Jr., in September 1962, Weatherly defended the Cup 4–1 against Gretel.

Weatherly continued to be used as a trial horse in America's Cup competition through the 1970 season when she was, surprisingly given her age, invited to enter the defender's trials.  Following that season, an engine was installed at the Derector shipyard in Mamaroneck, NY. She then motored up the Hudson and through the Erie Canal to the Great Lakes and on to the Palmer Johnson Shipyard in Wisconsin, where she was modified for offshore racing both on deck and below. Weatherly had an active racing career on the Great Lakes and the SORC under the ownership of Doug Jones. 

In the mid '70s, Weatherly was sold.  She is now normally berthed dockside at the Newport Harbor Hotel and Marina in Rhode Island, and is available for chartering.  She was listed on the National Register of Historic Places in 2012.

See also
National Register of Historic Places listings in Newport County, Rhode Island

References

External links

Yachts of New York Yacht Club members
America's Cup defenders
Individual sailing vessels
National Register of Historic Places in Rhode Island
Newport, Rhode Island
1950s sailing yachts
12-metre class yachts
1962 America's Cup